Juan Valderrama Blanca (24 May 1916 – 12 April 2004), better known as Juanito Valderrama, was a Spanish flamenco and folk singer. Although he was known for singing copla, he always claimed to be a flamenco singer.

Born in Torredelcampo, Juanito's recording career began in 1935 and lasted more than 60 years. Among his most famous songs is "El emigrante", written in 1949, a ballad for the millions of displaced Spaniards who fled the country in the years after the Spanish Civil War. In 1960 he appeared in the film of the same name.

He was romantically and professionally partnered with singer and actress Dolores Abril from 1954 until his death in 2004. The couple had two children,  and Juana Dolores Valderrama, who both became singers.

Filmography

References

External links
Telegraph obituary
Juanito Valderrama's biography and discography

1916 births
2004 deaths
People from the Province of Jaén (Spain)
Singers from Andalusia
Flamenco singers
20th-century Spanish singers
20th-century Spanish male singers